Lynne Walz is a Nebraska Senator for the Unicameral. She currently represents District 15 which includes Fremont, NE and surrounding areas.  She is a member of the Democratic Party but the Nebraska Unicameral is a nonpartisan elected body.

Early life and education 
Walz was born in Fremont, Nebraska and graduated from Arlington High School in 1981. She then went on to Midland Lutheran College to earn a B.A. in elementary education in 1994. She married her husband in 1986 and now has 3 children and 4 grandchildren.

Walz is a former teacher and worked for Fremont Public Schools and Archbishop Bergan. She is a current realtor at Don Peterson and Associates. Before entering the state legislature, Walz was on the Fremont Bergan School Board and served as the president of Fremont Board of Realtors.

Political career

Election results 
Walz was first elected to the state legislature in 2016, defeating incumbent David Schnoor with 51% of the vote. She was chosen as the running mate (Lieutenant Governor) of fellow State Senator Bob Krist in his 2018 campaign for Governor. The Krist-Walz ticket lost the election receiving 41% of votes. Walz won reelection on November 3, 2020, against David Rogers with 59.6% of the votes. Walz will be term limited in 2025.

Committees 
At the beginning of the 2017 Legislative Session, Walz sat on the Education and Natural Resources Committees. From 2019 till now, she sits on both the Health and Human Services and Education Committee.

In 2021, she ran for Education Chair and won against incumbent Senator Mike Groene. Chairs are elected through a secret ballot and the final vote was 25–23. The secret ballot initiative has led to several Senators attempting rule changes every year.

References

21st-century American women politicians
21st-century American politicians
Living people
Midland University alumni
Democratic Party Nebraska state senators
People from Fremont, Nebraska
Women state legislators in Nebraska
1963 births